Juan Francisco Corrales Rodríguez (born June 16, 1955), better known as Frank Corral, is a Mexican-American former NFL placekicker who played from 1978 to 1981. He attended Norte Vista High School in Riverside, California and played college football at University of California, Los Angeles. He was a part of the Rams' Super Bowl XIV team. He later played with the Chicago Blitz, the Arizona Wranglers and the Houston Gamblers of the United States Football League (USFL).

Early life
Corral was born on June 16, 1955 in Delicias, Chihuahua. His father, Alfonso Corrales Ruiz, hailed from Ciudad Jiménez while his mother, Soledad Rodríguez Natividad, was from Camargo. The family moved to Ciudad Juárez before immigrating to the United States, where they lived in Colorado before settling in California.

Corral was a six-sport athlete at Norte Vista High School in Riverside, California, playing football along with baseball, basketball, tennis, soccer, and track and field. He earned a football scholarship to UCLA.

Career 
Drafted in the third round of the 1978 NFL draft, Corral won the placekicking duties for the Los Angeles Rams in his rookie season. He added punting chores to his list of duties in 1980 and 1981 and remains the last NFL player to have been both the starting placekicker and punter for his team. In 1982, he was replaced by John Misko (punting) and Mike Lansford (placekicking). He would not return to the NFL.

In 1983 Corral moved to the USFL. While playing for the Chicago Blitz, Corral connected on 37 of 40 extra point attempts and 22 of 41 field goals for 105 points. He also was the punter for Chicago, punting 74 times for 2989 yards and 40.4 average. The next year, for the Arizona Wranglers, he was 63 of 65 on PATs and 11 of 21 in field goals for 96 points. He also punted 69 times for 2856 yards and a 41.4 average.

In 1985 for the Houston Gamblers he punted 24 times for 961 yards and a 40.0-yard average and handled the kickoff duties. Toni Fritsch handled the placekicking duties for the Gamblers.

References

1955 births
Living people
American football placekickers
Arizona Wranglers players
Chicago Blitz players
Houston Gamblers players
Los Angeles Rams players
Mexican players of American football
National Conference Pro Bowl players
Sportspeople from Chihuahua (state)
UCLA Bruins football players
Players of American football from Riverside, California
People from Delicias, Chihuahua